Lingayen is the capital of Pangasinan province, in the Philippines.

Lingayen may also refer to:

 Lingayen Gulf, a gulf in the Philippines
 Invasion of Lingayen Gulf, an Allied amphibious operation in the Philippines during World War II
 USS Lingayen, a Commencement Bay class escort carrier of the United States Navy